Niek is a Dutch masculine given name. It is a short form (usually a hypocorism) of Nicolaas, or sometimes of Nicasius or Dominic. People with the name include:
Niek de graef 
Niek van Dijk (born 1951), Dutch orthopaedic surgeon
Niek du Toit, South African arms dealer and mercenary
 (1913–1988), Dutch actor and WW II resistance fighter
Niek Kemps (born 1952), Dutch visual artist
Niek Kimmann (born 1996), Dutch BMX racing cyclist
Niek Loohuis (born 1986), Dutch footballer
Niek Michel (1912–1971), Dutch football goalkeeper 
 (born 1944), Dutch board game designer
Niek te Veluwe (born 1993), Dutch footballer
Niek Versteegen (born 1952), Dutch footballer
Niek Vossebelt (born 1991), Dutch footballer

See also
Nick (given name)

Dutch masculine given names